This is an incomplete list of Martian canals from the erroneous belief in the late 19th and early 20th centuries that "Martian canals" existed on the surface of the red planet.  These canals were named by Giovanni Schiaparelli and Percival Lowell, amongst others, after real and legendary rivers of various places on Earth or the mythological underworld.  A partial list of names are provided below with the regions that the canals were thought to connect.

A

B-D

E-F

G-H

I-M

N-O

P-R

S-X

Sources

References

External links
Mars and Its Canals by Percival Lowell (1906)
Mars by Percival Lowell

Albedo features on Mars
Mars